The Syrphoidea are a superfamily of flies containing only two families under present classification, one of which (Syrphidae) has a great number of the most common and familiar flies. One of these familiar flies is Eristalis tenax, or otherwise known as the drone fly.

References

External links

 
Diptera superfamilies